Seventy-Six Township, Iowa may refer to:

Seventy-Six Township, Muscatine County, Iowa
Seventy-Six Township, Washington County, Iowa